Nicholas James Job (born 27 July 1949) is an English professional golfer who plays on the European Senior Tour. He has won five times on the tour.

Professional career
Job turned professional in 1965 and qualified for the 1966 Open Championship as a 16-year-old. He played on the British circuit, winning two age-restricted tournaments, the Gor-Ray Under-24 Championship in 1969 and the under-23 BUA Rising Star Tournament in 1970.

Job joined the European Tour when it started in 1972 and finished in the top-100 on the European Tour Order of Merit 12 times, with a best ranking of 26th in 1981. His best tournament result on the European Tour came at the 1978 Greater Manchester Open, where he lost to Brian Barnes in a playoff.

Job played on the South African Tour in the winter and had a decent amount of success. He finished in third place at the 1973 Corlett Drive Classic behind Dale Hayes of South Africa. Three years later, he won the Victoria Falls Classic in Salisbury, Rhodesia, defeating Andries Oosthuizen in a playoff.

After turning 50, Job had considerable success playing on the European Seniors Tour, winning five times between 2000 and 2008. At the age of 64, he finished third in the 2013 Berenberg Masters and he continued playing on the tour into his 70s. In 2019, he set a new record for the number of appearances in European Seniors Tour events.

Professional wins (8)

Sunshine Tour wins (1)
1976 Victoria Falls Classic

Other wins (3)
1969 Gor-Ray Under-24 Championship
1970 BUA Rising Star Tournament
1973 Kent Open

European Senior Tour wins (5)

European Senior Tour playoff record (1–0)

Playoff record
European Tour playoff record (0–1)

Results in major championships

Note: Job only played in The Open Championship.

WD = Withdrew
CUT = missed the half-way cut (3rd round cut in 1969 Open Championship)
"T" = tied

Team appearances
Hennessy Cognac Cup  (representing Great Britain and Ireland): 1980 (winners)
PGA Cup (representing Great Britain & Ireland/Europe): 1988, 1992, 1994, 1996 (tie)

References

External links

English male golfers
European Tour golfers
European Senior Tour golfers
People from Haslemere
People from Thames Ditton
1949 births
Living people